is the 45th single of the Japanese group Morning Musume, released on April 6, 2011 on the Zetima record label. The single sold 33,698 copies in its first week, charting at #5 on the weekly Oricon singles charts and peaking at #7 on the Japan Billboard Hot 100.

Background
"Maji Desu ka Ska!" is the first single to feature Morning Musume's ninth generation, Mizuki Fukumura, Erina Ikuta, Riho Sayashi and Kanon Suzuki, since their addition to the group in January 2011, and the first following the departures of Eri Kamei, Junjun and Linlin, who graduated in December 2010. The song is noted to have a ska feel to it, which was ultimately chosen by producer Tsunku instead of a more reggae-oriented song.

The single was released in five versions, the first single by the group to be released in more than four types: a regular edition, and four limited editions (A, B, C and D) all including a different DVD. Each DVD contains a solo interview with a member of the ninth generation. All limited editions and the first press of the regular edition sport different covers and contain a serial number card, which could be used to enter a draw to win release event tickets.

On February 23, 2011, Bijo Gaku, Hello! Project's weekly variety show, aired the first preview of the song. The following day an official preview was aired on radio.

The single was originally due to be released on March 23; however, due to the 2011 Tōhoku earthquake and tsunami, the release was postponed and later rescheduled for April 6.

Upon its release, the single was the group's 45th consecutive top-10 single, with all releases since "Morning Coffee" having charted within the top 10 on the Oricon charts. This feat equaled SMAP's record of 45 consecutive top 10-charting singles, whose 45th single, "This is Love", was released in August 2010.

Participating members
5th generation: Ai Takahashi, Risa Niigaki
6th generation: Sayumi Michishige, Reina Tanaka
8th generation: Aika Mitsui
9th generation : Mizuki Fukumura, Erina Ikuta, Riho Sayashi, Kanon Suzuki

Track list

Personnel 
 Ai Takahashi – main vocals
 Risa Niigaki – center vocal
 Sayumi Michishige – center vocals
 Reina Tanaka – main vocals
 Aika Mitsui – center vocals
 Mizuki Fukumura – center vocals
 Erina Ikuta – center vocals
 Riho Sayashi – center vocals
 Kanon Suzuki – center vocals

Track 1
Chorus: Ai Takahashi, Tsunku
Guitar: Koji Kamada
Programming, guitar, bass: Masanori Takumi
Track 2
Chorus: Ai Takahashi
Keyboard, programming: Kaoru Okubo
Guitar: Koji Kamada

Charts

References

External links
Official profile (CD and CD+DVD) 
Profile on Hello! Project.com 
Profile on oricon charts 
Tsunku's comments 

2011 singles
Japanese-language songs
Morning Musume songs
Song recordings produced by Tsunku
Zetima Records singles
Songs written by Tsunku